The 1914–15 Divizia A was the sixth season of Divizia A, the top-level football league of Romania.

Final table

References

1914-15
1914–15 in European association football leagues
1914–15 in Romanian football